Zhang Chi (born 8 July 1987 in Jinan, Shandong) is a Chinese footballer who currently plays as a midfielder or right-back for Shandong Taishan in the Chinese Super League.

Club career
Zhang Chi is a graduate of the Shandong Luneng under-19 youth team before he received his promotion to the senior team in 2008, however despite not playing a game throughout the season, he was included in the squad that won the league title. Zhang Chi wouldn't go on to make his debut for Shandong until July 19, 2010, when he came on as a substitute in a league game against Nanchang Hengyuan in a 1-0 victory. This would be followed by his first start for the team on July 28, 2010 in a league game against Shanghai Shenhua, which Shandong won 2-1. These performances would impress the Head coach Branko Ivanković and he would start to establish himself as a regular within the team that went on to win the 2010 Chinese Super League title. 

Zhang Chi's progression as a player would be halted when on April 1, 2011 in a league game against Chengdu Blades F.C. he would break his left ankle in a collision with Chengdu player Li Gang. That injury would see Zhang Chi miss out on three years of football before he was able to make his comeback and make his return to the field on May 22, 2014 in a league game against Guangzhou R&F F.C. that Shandong won 3-1. He would gradually establish himself as a regular once more within the team and go on gain his third league title with the club when he was part of the team that won the 2021 Chinese Super League title.

Career statistics
.

Honours

Club
Shandong Luneng/ Shandong Taishan
Chinese Super League: 2008, 2010, 2021.
Chinese FA Cup: 2014, 2020, 2021, 2022.
Chinese FA Super Cup: 2015

References

External links

1987 births
Living people
Sportspeople from Jinan
Chinese footballers
Footballers from Shandong
Shandong Taishan F.C. players
Chinese Super League players
Association football midfielders
Association football fullbacks